Brasileirinhas is a Brazilian pornographic film studio founded in the late 1990's by Luis Alvarenga.

Brasileirinhas label has some of the most famous pornographic performers of Brazil including Monica Mattos, Pâmela Butt, Júlia Paes, Patrícia Kimberly, Monica Santhiago, Nikki Rio, Lana Starck, Verônica Bella, Cyane Lima, Mayara Rodrigues, Anne Midori (Yumi Saito), Cris Bel, Babalú, Sílvia Saenz, Tamiry Chiavari, Gina Jolie, Melissa Pitanga, with prominent male performer Kid Bengala.

It is also well known for its films featuring celebrities like Gretchen, Gretchen's son Thammy, Rita Cadillac, Alexandre Frota, Regininha Poltergeist, Leila Lopes, Mateus Carrieri or minor TV celebrities like Vivi Fernandez (É o Tchan! dancer nominee), Luanda Boaz (É o Tchan! dancer contest finalist), Márcia Imperator, Bruna Ferraz, and Bianca Soares.

In April 2011, there were reports that Brasileirinhas would be closed down and its assets would be sold to Sexy Hot. However, the current owner, Clayton Nunes, denied allegations, and the company remains opened, working in both internet and newsstands markets, besides rental market in sex shops and video stores.

References

External links
 
 

Brazilian pornography
Pornographic film studios
Mass media companies established in 1996
Film production companies of Brazil
Companies based in São Paulo